Ronald Charles Colman (9 February 1891 – 19 May 1958) was an English-born actor, starting his career in theatre and silent film in his native country, then immigrating to the United States and having a successful Hollywood film career. He was most popular during the 1920s, 1930s and 1940s. He received Oscar nominations for Bulldog Drummond (1929), Condemned (1929) and Random Harvest (1942). Colman starred in several classic films, including A Tale of Two Cities (1935), Lost Horizon (1937) and The Prisoner of Zenda (1937). He also played the starring role in the Technicolor classic Kismet (1944), with Marlene Dietrich, which was nominated for four Academy Awards. In 1947, he won an Academy Award for Best Actor and Golden Globe Award for Best Actor for the film A Double Life.

Colman was an inaugural recipient of a star on the Hollywood Walk of Fame for his work in motion pictures. He was awarded a second star for his television work.

Early years
Ronald Charles Colman was born in Richmond, Surrey, England, the third son (his eldest brother died in infancy in 1882) and fifth child of Charles Colman, a silk merchant, and his wife Marjory Read Fraser. His surviving siblings were Gladys, Edith, Eric and Freda. 

He was educated at boarding school in Littlehampton, where he discovered that he enjoyed acting, despite his shyness. He intended to study engineering at Cambridge, but his father's sudden death from pneumonia in 1907 made it financially impossible.

He became a well-known amateur actor, and was a member of the West Middlesex Dramatic Society in 1908–09. He made his first appearance on the professional stage in 1914.

First World War
While working as a clerk at the British Steamship Company in the City of London, he joined the London Scottish Regiment in 1909 as a Territorial Army soldier. At the outbreak of the First World War, he was mobilised, and sent to France in September 1914. On 31 October 1914, at the Battle of Messines, Colman was seriously wounded by shrapnel in his ankle, which gave him a limp that he would attempt to hide throughout his acting career. As a consequence, he was mustered out as invalid in 1915. His fellow Hollywood actors Claude Rains, Herbert Marshall, Cedric Hardwicke, and Basil Rathbone all saw service with the London Scottish in the war.

Career

Theatre

Colman had sufficiently recovered from his wartime injuries to appear at the London Coliseum on 19 June 1916 as Rahmat Sheikh in The Maharani of Arakan, with Lena Ashwell, at the Playhouse in December that year as Stephen Weatherbee in the Charles Goddard/Paul Dickey play The Misleading Lady, and at the Court Theatre in March 1917 as Webber in Partnership. At the same theatre, the following year he appeared in Eugène Brieux's Damaged Goods. At the Ambassadors Theatre in February 1918, he played George Lubin in The Little Brother. In 1918, he toured the UK as David Goldsmith in The Bubble.

In 1920, Colman went to America and toured with Robert Warwick in The Dauntless Three and subsequently toured with Fay Bainter in East Is West. He married his first wife, Thelma Raye, in 1920; they divorced in 1934. At the Booth Theatre in New York City in January 1921, he played the Temple Priest in William Archer's play The Green Goddess. With George Arliss at the 39th Street Theatre in August 1921, he appeared as Charles in The Nightcap. In September 1922, he had great success as Alain Sergyll at the Empire Theatre (New York City) in La Tendresse, which was to be his final stage work.

Film

Colman had first appeared in films in Britain in 1917 and 1919 for director Cecil Hepworth. He subsequently acted for the old Broadwest Film Company in Snow in the Desert. While he was on stage in New York City in La Tendresse, director Henry King saw him and engaged him as the leading man in the 1923 film The White Sister, opposite Lillian Gish. He was an immediate success. Thereafter, Colman virtually abandoned the stage for film. 

He became a very popular silent film star in both romantic and adventure films, among them The Dark Angel (1925), Stella Dallas (1926), Beau Geste (1926), and The Winning of Barbara Worth (1926). His dark hair and eyes and his athletic and riding ability (he did most of his own stunts until late in his career) led reviewers to describe him as a "Valentino type". He was often cast in similar, exotic roles. Towards the end of the silent era, Colman was teamed with Hungarian actress Vilma Bánky under Samuel Goldwyn; the two were a popular film team, rivalling Greta Garbo and John Gilbert.

Although he was a huge success in silent films, he was unable to capitalise on one of his chief assets until the advent of the talking picture – "his beautifully modulated and cultured voice" also described as "a bewitching, finely modulated, resonant voice". Colman was often viewed as a suave English gentleman, whose voice embodied chivalry and mirrored the image of a "stereotypical English gentleman". Commenting on Colman's appeal,  English film critic David Shipman stated that Colman was "the dream lover – calm, dignified, trustworthy. Although he was a lithe figure in adventure stories, his glamour – which was genuine – came from his respectability; he was an aristocratic figure, without being aloof."

His first major talkie success was in 1930, when he was nominated for the Academy Award for Best Actor for two roles – Condemned and Bulldog Drummond. He thereafter appeared in a number of notable films: Raffles in 1930, Clive of India and A Tale of Two Cities in 1935, Under Two Flags in 1936, The Prisoner of Zenda and Lost Horizon in 1937, If I Were King in 1938, and Random Harvest and The Talk of the Town in 1942. He won the Best Actor Oscar in 1948 for A Double Life. He next starred in a screwball comedy, 1950's Champagne for Caesar.

At the time of his death, Colman was contracted by Metro-Goldwyn-Mayer for the lead role in Village of the Damned. After Colman's death, however, the film became a British production starring George Sanders, who married Colman's widow, Benita Hume.

Fame
Colman has been mentioned in many novels, but he is specifically mentioned in Ralph Ellison's Invisible Man because of his charming, well-known voice. The main character of this novel says that he wishes he could have a voice like Colman's because it is charming, and relates the voice to that of a gentleman or a man from Esquire magazine. Colman was indeed very well known for his voice. Encyclopædia Britannica says that Colman had a "resonant, mellifluous speaking voice with a unique, pleasing timbre". Along with his charming voice, Colman had a very confident performing manner that helped make him a major star of sound films.

Radio and television
As early as 1942, Colman joined forces with several other Hollywood luminaries to inaugurate international broadcasts by the CBS radio network over La Cadena de las Americas (The Network of the Americas) under the supervision of the Office of the Coordinator of Inter-American Affairs chaired by Nelson Rockefeller. In the process, he contributed substantially to the implementation of President Franklin Roosevelt's cultural diplomacy initiatives throughout South America during World War II.
 
Colman's vocal talents contributed to National Broadcasting Company programming on D-Day, 6 June 1944. On that day, Colman read "Poem and Prayer for an Invading Army" written by Edna St. Vincent Millay for exclusive radio use by NBC.

Beginning in 1945, Colman made many guest appearances on The Jack Benny Program on radio, alongside his second wife, stage and screen actress Benita Hume, whom he married in 1938. Their comedy work as Benny's perpetually exasperated next-door neighbors led to their own radio comedy The Halls of Ivy from 1950 to 1952, created by Fibber McGee & Molly mastermind Don Quinn, on which the Colmans played the literate, charming president of a middle American college and his former-actress wife. Listeners were surprised to discover that the episode of 24 January 1951, "The Goya Bequest" – a story examining the bequest of a Goya painting that was suspected of being a fraud hyped by its late owner to avoid paying customs duties when bringing it to the United States – was written by Colman himself, who poked fun at his accomplishment while taking a rare turn giving the evening's credits at the show's conclusion.

The Halls of Ivy ran on NBC radio from 1950 to 1952, then moved to CBS television for the 1954–55 season.

Colman was also the host and occasional star of the syndicated anthology Favorite Story (1946–49). Of note was his narration and portrayal of Scrooge in a 1948 adaptation of A Christmas Carol.

Death
Colman had an operation in 1957 for a lung infection, and suffered from ill health afterwards. He died on 19 May 1958, aged 67, from acute emphysema in Santa Barbara, California, and was interred in the Santa Barbara Cemetery. He had a daughter, Juliet Benita (born 1944), with his second wife, Benita Hume.

Awards, honours and legacy
Colman was nominated three times for the Academy Award for Best Actor. At the 3rd Academy Awards ceremony he received a single nomination for his work in two films; Bulldog Drummond (1929) and Condemned (1929). He was nominated again for Random Harvest (1942), before winning for A Double Life (1947), in which he played the role of Anthony John, an actor playing Othello who comes to identify with the character. He also won the Golden Globe Award for Best Actor in 1947 for A Double Life. In 2002, Colman's Oscar statuette was sold at auction by Christie's for US$174,500.

Colman was a recipient of the George Eastman Award, given by George Eastman House for distinguished contribution to the art of film.

Colman has two stars on the Hollywood Walk of Fame in Los Angeles, one for motion pictures at 6801 Hollywood Boulevard and one for television at 1623 Vine Street.

He is the subject of a biography written by his daughter Juliet Benita Colman in 1975: Ronald Colman: A Very Private Person.

The Dublin slang term "ronnie", referring to a moustache, derives from Colman's thin moustache.

Filmography

See also

 List of actors with Academy Award nominations

References

Bibliography 
 Parker, John, editor, Who's Who in the Theatre, 10th edition revised, London, 1947, p. 437.

External links

 
 
 
 
 Ronald Colman at Virtual History
 

1891 births
1958 deaths
Military personnel from Surrey
Best Actor Academy Award winners
Best Drama Actor Golden Globe (film) winners
British Army personnel of World War I
English male film actors
English male silent film actors
English male stage actors
English male television actors
People from Richmond, London
London Scottish soldiers
20th-century English male actors
Deaths from emphysema
Deaths from lung disease
British expatriate male actors in the United States
Burials at Santa Barbara Cemetery
United Service Organizations entertainers